Charlotte Ramel, (born 29 September 1957) is a Swedish actress and director. She has been active in both films and theater, acting in TV series like Rederiet, and films like Falsk som vatten.

Biography 
Lotta Ramel studied at Teaterhögskolan in Malmö between 1977 and 1980, her classmates included Johan Ulveson and Lars-Göran Persson. She has acted in several films, such as Hans Alfredson's Falsk som vatten (1985) and television series like Rederiet (1995) which was broadcast on SVT. She has worked at several theaters like Malmö stadsteater (1980), Norrbottensteatern in Luleå (1981–1985). Since 1985, she has been working at Stockholms stadsteater.  Lotta Ramel has also been working at Tyrolen and Teater Tribunalen. She directed the play En strut karameller på Vasateatern in 2008, and the play Kolla Povel about her father Povel Ramel in 2009. 

In 2010, Lotta Ramel and her brother Mikael Ramel along with Backa Hans Eriksson toured with the play Povels Naturbarn. She also works as a teacher in acting at Södra Latin in Stockholm. In 2014, Ramel directed the play Det är synd om papporna with the theater company Unga Giljotin.

In 2009, Ramel took part in an episode of the SVT show Who do You Think You Are? In the 2018 film Ted: För kärlekens skull about the work and life of Ted Gärdestad, Ramel is played by actress Happy Jankell. In the same film, she plays her own mother Susanna Ramel.

Personal life 
She is the daughter of the entertainer Povel Ramel and the actress Susanna Ramel, and the sister of the singer Mikael Ramel, and the half-sister of Marianne Gillgren and Carina Gillgren. 

Between 1976 and 1978, she was married to singer Ted Gärdestad. Along with Johan H:son Kjellgren she has a son, Jim Ramel Kjellgren, and with Ola Fuchs she has a daughter, Lycke Fuchs Ramel.

In 2017, Ramel supported the Me Too movement in Sweden.

Filmography 
2018 – Ted: För kärlekens skull
2004 – Kyrkogårdsön
1995 – Rederiet
1989 – La strada del amore
1987 – I dag röd
1986 – Affären Ramel
1985 – Falsk som vatten
1978 – Bevisbördan (TV-series) 
1977 – Semlons gröna dalar
1977 – Jack
1975 – Långtradarchaufförens berättelser (TV-series) 

Source

References

External links 

Living people
1957 births
Actresses from Stockholm
Ramel family